K07UF was a low-power Class A television station in Abilene, Texas, broadcasting locally in analog on VHF channel 7. Founded January 14, 1988, the station was owned by Abilene Christian University.

Until October 2008, K07UF broadcast the Annenberg Channel in October 2008. The station's license was cancelled by the Federal Communications Commission on June 12, 2015, for failure to file a renewal application.

External links

Abilene Christian University
Educational and instructional television channels
07UF
Television channels and stations established in 1989
Defunct television stations in the United States
Television channels and stations disestablished in 2015
07UF